The 2010–11 Rider Broncs men's basketball team represented Rider University in the 2010–11 NCAA Division I men's basketball season. The Broncs, led by head coach Tommy Dempsey, played their home games at the Alumni Gymnasium in Lawrenceville, New Jersey, as members of the Metro Atlantic Athletic Conference. The Broncs finished in a tie for 2nd in the MAAC during the regular season, earning the 3rd seed in the MAAC tournament. Rider advanced to the semifinals of the MAAC tournament, where they were eliminated by Iona.

Rider failed to qualify for the NCAA tournament, but were invited to the 2011 CIT. The Broncs were eliminated in the first round of the CIT, losing to Northern Iowa, 84–50.

Roster 

Source

Schedule and results

|-
!colspan=9 style=|Exhibition

|-
!colspan=9 style=|Regular season

|-
!colspan=9 style=| MAAC tournament

|-
!colspan=9 style=| CollegeInsider.com tournament

Source

References

Rider Broncs men's basketball seasons
Rider
Rider
Rider men's basketball
Rider men's basketball